The Chunnakam Police station massacre refers to the killing of 19 ethnic Tamil civilians by the Sri Lankan Police, at Chunnakam, a suburb of Jaffna in 1984. This was among the first of the series of massacres of Tamil civilians by the Sri Lankan state forces, since the outbreak of the Sri Lankan Civil War.

Massacre
Chunnakam is situated in the Uduvil Assistant Government Agent Division in the Jaffna District. Ten kilometers from the Jaffna town, on the Kankesanthurai road, there is the Chunnakam Junction situated. The Chunnakam Police station was located about 250 metres south of this junction.

Many Tamil youth had been previously arrested since the escalation of conflict between the Army and the Tamil groups in the peninsula. Almost all of them were arrested under the draconian Prevention of Terrorism Act (POTA) without evidence and were kept in various government buildings in the region.

On 8 January 1984, the State Police placed a time bomb in the Chunnakam Police station where at least 19 Tamil youth were held under the POTA and left the building. When the bomb exploded, all of them inside were killed. One man who attempted to rescue his friends inside also lost his life.

See also
Chunnakam market massacre, another massacre of local Tamils which occurred in the same town, two months later.

Sources
THE NORTHEAST SECRETARIAT ON HUMAN RIGHTS (NESOHR). Massacres of Tamils (1956-2008)p. 14–15. Chennai: Manitham Publishers, 2009. 

Massacres in 1984
Attacks on buildings and structures in Sri Lanka
Attacks on civilians attributed to the Sri Lanka Police
Massacres in Sri Lanka
January 1984 events in Asia
Mass murder of Sri Lankan Tamils
Terrorist incidents in Sri Lanka in 1984